Julyana Cristina da Silva (born 1 May 1996) is a Brazilian Paralympic athlete. She won the bronze medal in the women's discus throw F57 event at the 2020 Summer Paralympics held in Tokyo, Japan.

References

External links
 

Living people
1996 births
Athletes from Rio de Janeiro (city)
Brazilian female discus throwers
Athletes (track and field) at the 2020 Summer Paralympics
Medalists at the 2020 Summer Paralympics
Paralympic medalists in athletics (track and field)
Paralympic bronze medalists for Brazil
Paralympic athletes of Brazil
Female competitors in athletics with disabilities
21st-century Brazilian women